The NASA Exceptional Achievement Medal is an award of the National Aeronautics and Space Administration established in 1991.  The medal is awarded to both civilian members of NASA and military astronauts.

To be awarded the medal, a NASA employee must make substantial contributions characterized by a substantial and significant improvement in operations, efficiency, service, financial savings, science, or technology which directly contribute to the mission of NASA.  For civilians, the decoration is typically bestowed to mid-level and senior NASA administrators who have supervised at least four to five successful NASA missions.  Astronauts may be awarded the decoration after two to three space flights.

Due to its prestige, the medal is authorized as a military decoration for display on active duty military uniforms upon application from the service member to the various branch of the military in which they serve.

Notable recipients
 Chris Adami, Jet Propulsion Laboratory, physicist
 Richard Arenstorf, Vanderbilt University, mathematician
 Gordon Cooper, astronaut
 Carl Sagan, astronomer
 Alan Shepard, astronaut
 John Young, astronaut
 Charles L. Bennett, observational astrophysicist
 Nancy Roman, astronomer, NASA executive
 Stephen P. Maran, astronomer
 Kimberly Robinson, CEO USSRC

Selected recipients by year
There are usually more than 100 recipients of this medal annually. For example, there were 177 recipients in 2010.

 Prem Chand Pandey, Jet Propulsion Laboratory, 1985 (NASA Certificate of Recognition and Cash Award)
 David Rochblatt, Jet Propulsion Laboratory Engineer, 1995 (NASA Exceptional Service Medal, 2012)
 Jon T. Adams, Jet Propulsion Laboratory, NASA Scatterometer Radio Frequency Subsystem, 1997
 Gary Flandro, University of Tennessee, UTSI, 1998
 Miguel San Martín, Jet Propulsion Laboratory, 1998
 John R. Casani, Jet Propulsion Laboratory, 1999, 2000
 Mark P. Stucky, Armstrong Flight Research Center, Eclipse Project Technical Lead & Project Pilot, 1999
 Joan Feynman, Jet Propulsion Laboratory, 2002
 Stephen G. Ungar, Goddard Space Flight Center, Earth Observing-1 Mission Scientist, 2002
 Kevin Delin, Jet Propulsion Laboratory, Sensor Web Inventor, 2004
 Adam Steltzner, Jet Propulsion Laboratory, 2004
 Keith Presson, Marshall Space Flight Center MPLM Project Office, 2005
 Carlos Ortiz Longo, Johnson Space Center, 2005
 Robert Sherwood, Jet Propulsion Laboratory, Autonomous Sciencecraft Project Manager, 2005
Mian Chin, Goddard Space Flight Center, physical scientist, 2005
 Rodney N. Phillips, Marshall Space Flight Center, Structural Dynamics Test Engineer, 2006
 Michael Dalton, Kennedy Space Center, Computer Systems Engineer, 2007
 Ashok Srivastava, Ames Research Center, Data Mining and Machine Learning, 2007 
 Quang-Viet Nguyen, Glenn Research Center, Research Aerospace Engineer, 2007
 Angelita Castro-Kelly, Mission Operations Manager, 2007
 Michael A. Gross, Jet Propulsion Laboratory, Phoenix Project Payload Manager, 2009
 Ryan M. Lien, Johnson Space Center, Lead ISS CAPCOM Expedition 17, 2009
 Eric Becker, Armstrong Flight Research Center, deputy director of Flight Operations, 2009
2010 Honorees:
 Jonathan H. Jiang, Jet Propulsion Laboratory, Research Scientist
 Michael Engle, Johnson Space Center, Chief Engineer, Astronaut Office
2011 Honorees:
 Gustavo Carreno, Armstrong Flight Research Center, Avionics Supervisor
 Philip Hall, Armstrong Flight Research Center, Global Hawk Deputy Project Manager
 Kevin D. James, Ames Research Center, Senior Research Engineer, ARIES/ORION Launch Abort Flight Dynamics Tests
 Terry D. Rolin, Ph.D., Marshall Space Flight Center, Avionics Failure Analyst
 Eddie Zavala, Armstrong Flight Research Center, SOFIA Program Manager
2012 Honorees:
 Patrick Hogan Ames Research Center, NASA WorldWind Project Manager
 Charles C. Cramer, Langley Research Center, Special Agent
2013 Honorees:
 Kobie Boykins, Jet Propulsion Laboratory, Senior Mechanical Engineer
 Jonathan H. Jiang, Jet Propulsion Laboratory, Principal Scientist
 Brett A. Smith, Jet Propulsion Laboratory, Dawn Attitude Control Team Leader
 David Y. Oh, Jet Propulsion Laboratory, Mars Science Laboratory Cross-Cutting Domain Lead
 Brett A. Smith, Jet Propulsion Laboratory, Dawn Attitude Control Team Leader
2014 Honorees:
 Stephen D. Van Genderen, Kennedy Space Center, Thermal Fluids Systems Analysis Engineer
2015 Honorees:
 Geoffrey S. Sage, Goddard Space Flight Center, Procurement Analyst
 Guy T. Noffsinger, NASA Headquarters, Senior Television Producer - NASA Television
 Justin C. Pane, Ames Research Center, Contracting Officer
 David K. Tow, Armstrong Flight Research Center, Range Systems Engineer
2016 Honorees:
 Jennifer C. Franzo John C. Stennis Space Center
 Carlos A. Gomez-Rosa, Goddard Space Flight Center, MAVEN Mission Director
 Quang-Viet Nguyen, NASA Headquarters, DSCOVR Program Executive
 David Howard Matthews, Armstrong Flight Research Center, Communications Security Program Manager
2018 Honorees:
 Bhanu Sood, Goddard Space Flight Center, Deputy Chief Technologist
2019 Honorees:
 Rita Sambruna, NASA Headquarters
2020 Honorees:
 Ryan Lien, Johnson Space Center, 56 Soyuz Mishap ISS Short Term Impact Team Lead Soyuz MS-10

See also
 List of NASA awards

References

External links
 NASA awards
 National Aeronautics and Space Administration Honor Awards (1969-1978)

Exceptional Achievement Medal
Awards established in 1991
1991 establishments in the United States